Mount Murray is a mountain in New South Wales, Australia with an elevation of 780 metres above sea level. It is located six kilometres outside Robertson. The mountain is named after Sir George Murray. Mount Murray is also the name of a location at the top of the Macquarie Pass on the Illawarra Highway. 

At the 2021 census, there were 53 residents at Mount Murray.

Heritage listings
Mount Murray has a number of heritage-listed sites, including:
 Moss Vale-Unanderra railway: Mount Murray railway station

References

Illawarra escarpment
Towns of the Southern Highlands (New South Wales)
Wingecarribee Shire